Jean-Jacques Beauvarlet-Charpentier (28 June 1734 – 6 May 1794) was a celebrated French organist and composer.

He was born in Abbeville. From 1763, he was a member of the Académie des Beaux Arts de Lyon (now École des Beaux-Arts). Then, from 1783 to 1793, he was organist at the Notre Dame de Paris.

Beauvarlet-Charpentier composed sonatas for keyboard and violin and numerous pieces for organ. He died in Paris.

His son Jacques-Marie (1766–1834) was also an organist and composer.

Discography
 Jean-Jacques Beauvarlet-Charpentier, œuvres pour orgue. Marina Tchebourkina aux grandes orgues historiques de l’Abbatiale Sainte-Croix de Bordeaux. CD I–II. — Paris : Natives, 2007.

References

External links
 
 e-Partitions Free organ pieces. La Victoire de l’Armée d’Italie for fortepiano by his son Jacques-Marie Beauvarlet-Charpentier.

French classical organists
French male organists
18th-century French composers
18th-century French male musicians
French male composers
1734 births
1794 deaths
People from Abbeville
18th-century keyboardists
Male classical organists